The 2013 European Individual Speedway Junior Championship (also known as the 2013 Speedway European Under 21 Championship) was the 16th edition of the Championship.

The final was staged at Güstrow in Germany and was won by Denmark's Mikkel Michelsen. He scored 13 points, level with Latvian Andžejs Ļebedevs, but won the run-off to claim the title.2013 Final Results.

Final - Güstrow 

 24 August 2013
  Güstrow

See also 
 2013 Speedway European Championship

References

2013
European Individual Junior